R-21 regional road is a Montenegrin roadway.

This road serves as a shortest connection between Šavnik and Kolašin.

History

In 1975, a tunnel under the Semolj was started. It would have been 1750 m long, and 420 m were excavated before the work was stopped the same year. 

In January 2016, the Ministry of Transport and Maritime Affairs published bylaw on categorisation of state roads. With new categorisation, part of R-18 regional road between Tušina and Mioska was renamed as R-21 regional road.

Major intersections

References

R-21